The  is one of the cabinet level ministries of the Japanese government. It is responsible for the judicial system, correctional services, and household, property and corporate registrations,Immigration control. It also serves as the government's legal representatives.

At the top of the ministry is the Minister of Justice, a member of the Cabinet, who is chosen by the Prime Minister from among members of the National Diet.

History

It acquired its present name under the post-war Constitution of Japan in 1952. Its responsibilities include administration of Japan's judicial system and the penal system. It represents the Japanese government in litigation, and is also responsible for maintaining the official registers of households, resident aliens, real estate and corporations.

Structure
The MOJ has jurisdiction over the National Bar Examination Commission, the Public Security Examination Commission, and the Public Security Intelligence Agency. Although the Public Prosecutors Office are administratively part of the Ministry of Justice, they are independent of the authority of the Minister of Justice.

The MOJ also oversees the Immigration Services Agency.

See also

 Penal system of Japan

References
 Kenkyusha's New Japanese–English Dictionary, Kenkyusha Limited, Tokyo 1991,

Footnotes

External links 

  
  
 Japanese Law Translation, Law/Term/context search site

Justice
Japan
Buildings of the Meiji period
1948 establishments in Japan
1871 establishments in Japan